The Penitentes is a lost 1915 silent film drama directed by Jack Conway and starring Orrin Johnson and Seena Owen. It was produced by D. W. Griffith's Fine Arts Film Company and distributed through Triangle Film Corporation.

Cast
Orrin Johnson - Manuel
Seena Owen - Dolores
Paul Gilmore - Colonel Juan Banca
Irene Hunt - Senorita Carmelia
Josephine Crowell - Carmelia's Mother
F. A. Turner - Father Rossi
Charles Clary - Father David
Allan Sears - The Chief Brother (*A. D. Sears)
Dark Cloud - Indian Chief

References

External links
The Penitentes @ IMDb.com

1915 films
American silent feature films
Lost American films
Films directed by Jack Conway
Films based on American novels
1915 drama films
American black-and-white films
Silent American drama films
1915 lost films
Lost drama films
1910s American films